In geometry, the truncated tetraheptagonal tiling is a uniform tiling of the hyperbolic plane. It has Schläfli symbol of tr{4,7}.

Images
Poincaré disk projection, centered on 14-gon:

Symmetry

The dual to this tiling represents the fundamental domains of [7,4] (*742) symmetry. There are 3 small index subgroups constructed from [7,4] by mirror removal and alternation. In these images fundamental domains are alternately colored black and white, and mirrors exist on the boundaries between colors.

Related polyhedra and tiling

References
 John H. Conway, Heidi Burgiel, Chaim Goodman-Strass, The Symmetries of Things 2008,  (Chapter 19, The Hyperbolic Archimedean Tessellations)

See also

Uniform tilings in hyperbolic plane
List of regular polytopes

External links 

 Hyperbolic and Spherical Tiling Gallery
 KaleidoTile 3: Educational software to create spherical, planar and hyperbolic tilings
 Hyperbolic Planar Tessellations, Don Hatch

Hyperbolic tilings
Isogonal tilings
Truncated tilings
Uniform tilings